= Dan Steingart =

American enginneer and professor

Daniel Steingart
- Occupation: Assistant Professor

Academic background
- Education: Brown University (BS), UC Berkeley (MS, PhD)
- Thesis: 'Printed On-Chip Electrochemical Storage'

Academic work
- Discipline: Energy Storage, Materials Science, & Engineering
- Website: http://steingart.princeton.edu/dan

Dan Steingart is an American materials science engineer, mechanical engineer, and co-founder of Wireless Industrial Technologies. He is currently a professor co-appointed in the departments of chemical and earth and environmental engineering at Columbia University, and co-director of the Columbia Electrochemical Energy Center.
